Yevhenii Oleksandrovych Makarenko (born 21 May 1991) is a Ukrainian professional footballer who plays as a defender for Fehérvár FC.

Career
He is product of FC Dynamo Kyiv sportive school. Makarenko was loaned to FC Hoverla Uzhhorod in Ukrainian Premier League from 10 July 2012.

On 11 August 2021, he joined Hungarian side Fehérvár FC.

He earned his first cap for the senior national football team of his country on 5 March 2014, in the 2–0 win over the United States.

Honours 
Dynamo Kyiv
Ukrainian Premier League: 2014–15, 2015–16
Ukrainian Cup: 2013–14, 2014–15

References

External links
 
 

1991 births
Living people
Ukrainian footballers
Ukraine international footballers
Ukraine under-21 international footballers
Footballers from Kyiv
Ukrainian Premier League players
Ukrainian First League players
Belgian Pro League players
Nemzeti Bajnokság I players
FC Dynamo Kyiv players
FC Dynamo-2 Kyiv players
FC Hoverla Uzhhorod players
K.V. Kortrijk players
R.S.C. Anderlecht players
Fehérvár FC players
UEFA Euro 2020 players
Ukrainian expatriate footballers
Expatriate footballers in Belgium
Ukrainian expatriate sportspeople in Belgium
Expatriate footballers in Hungary
Ukrainian expatriate sportspeople in Hungary
Association football midfielders